Scott Clayton and Jonny O'Mara were the defending champions but only Clayton chose to defend his title, partnering Adil Shamasdin. Clayton lost in the semifinals to Laurynas Grigelis and Zdeněk Kolář.

Grigelis and Kolář won the title after defeating Tomislav Brkić and Dustin Brown 7–5, 7–6(9–7) in the final.

Seeds

Draw

References
 Main draw

Trofeo Faip–Perrel - Doubles
2019 Doubles